Half Moon Bay is a city in San Mateo County, California

Half Moon Bay may also refer to:

Australia
 Halfmoon Bay (Tasmania), a bay in Tasmania, near 
 Half Moon Bay (Victoria), a bay in Black Rock, Victoria

In Canada
 Half Moon Bay (Nunavut), an Arctic waterway in Nunavut
 Half Moon Bay (Toronto), a body of water near Ontario Place (west of Stanley Barracks / New Fort York)  and place where United States Navy made land fall during the Battle of York
 Halfmoon Bay, British Columbia, a community on the Sunshine Coast of British Columbia

New Zealand
 Half Moon Bay, Auckland, a coastal suburb located near Pakuranga in Auckland
 Halfmoon Bay (Stewart Island), a bay on the eastern coast of Stewart Island/Rakiura and also sometimes the name for Oban, New Zealand on the same island

Saudi Arabia
 Half Moon Bay, Saudi Arabia

United States
 Half Moon Bay (California), a bay on the San Mateo County coast of California, namesake of the city there

Other uses
 Half Moon Bay (album), by Bill Evans, 1998
 "Half Moon Bay", a 2009 song by Train from Save Me, San Francisco
 Half Moon Beach, Gokarna

See also

 2023 Half Moon Bay shootings